Cruz del Tercer Milenio (Spanish for "Third Millennium Cross") is an 83 meter tall, 40 meter wide, concrete cross located at the top of El Vigía hill in Coquimbo, Chile. Construction began in 1999 and it was completed in 2001. It sits 197 meters above sea level. It was considered the tallest monument in South America.

External links
Official site
http://www.skyscraperpage.com/diagrams/?b3810

Monuments and memorials in Chile
Monumental crosses
Buildings and structures in Coquimbo Region
2001 establishments in Chile
Buildings and structures completed in 2001
Modernist architecture in Chile
Brutalist architecture